Gajwel Assembly constituency is a constituency of Telangana Legislative Assembly, India. It is part of Medak Lok Sabha constituency. It is one of 10 constituencies in erstwhile Medak district and is located around 64 km from state capital Hyderabad.

Kalvakuntla Chandrashekar Rao, the first and incumbent Chief Minister of Telangana is representing this constituency.

Mandals
The Assembly Constituency presently comprises the following Mandals:

Members of Legislative Assebmbly 
Members of Legislative Assembly who represented Gajwel

Election results

Telangana Legislative Assembly election, 2018

Telangana Legislative Assembly election, 2014

See also
 List of constituencies of Telangana Legislative Assembly

Notes
Till 2004 General elections, Gajwel Assembly constituency was reserved for SC 
From 2009 General elections, it was changed to General

References

Assembly constituencies of Telangana
Medak district